In mathematics, the Brunn–Minkowski theorem (or Brunn–Minkowski inequality) is an inequality relating the volumes (or more generally Lebesgue measures) of compact subsets of Euclidean space. The original version of the Brunn–Minkowski theorem (Hermann Brunn 1887; Hermann Minkowski 1896) applied to convex sets; the generalization to compact nonconvex sets stated here is due to Lazar Lyusternik (1935).

Statement
Let n ≥ 1 and let μ denote the Lebesgue measure on Rn. Let A and B be two nonempty compact subsets of Rn. Then the following inequality holds:

where A + B denotes the Minkowski sum:

The theorem is also true in the setting where  are only assumed to be measurable and non-empty.

Multiplicative version
The multiplicative form of Brunn–Minkowski inequality states that  for all .

The Brunn–Minkowski inequality is equivalent to the multiplicative version. 

In particular, . 

Conversely, using the multiplicative form, we find

.

The Prékopa–Leindler inequality is a functional generalization of this version of Brunn–Minkowski.

On the hypothesis

Measurability
On the other hand, if  are Borel measurable, then  is the continuous image of the Borel set  , so analytic and thus measurable. See the discussion in Gardner's survey for more on this, as well as ways to avoid measurability hypothesis. 

We note that in the case that A and B are compact, so is A + B, being the image of the compact set  under the continuous addition map : , so the measurability conditions are easy to verify.

Non-emptiness

The condition that  are both non-empty is clearly necessary. This condition is not part of the multiplicative versions of BM stated below.

Proofs

We give two well known proofs of Brunn–Minkowski. 

We give a well-known argument that follows a general recipe of arguments in measure theory; namely, it establishes a simple case by direct analysis, uses induction to establish a finitary extension of that special case, and then uses general machinery to obtain the general case as a limit. A discussion of this history of this proof can be found in Theorem 4.1 in Gardner's survey on Brunn–Minkowski.

We prove the version of the Brunn–Minkowski theorem that only requires  to be measurable and non-empty. 

 The case that A and B are axis aligned boxes:

By translation invariance of volumes, it suffices to take . Then . In this special case, the Brunn–Minkowski inequality asserts that .

 The case where A and B are both disjoint unions of finitely many such boxes:

We will use induction on the total number of boxes, where the previous calculation establishes the base case of two boxes. First, we observe that there is an axis aligned hyperplane H that such that each side of H contains an entire box of A. To see this, it suffices to reduce to the case where A consists of two boxes, and then calculate that the negation of this statement implies that the two boxes have a point in common.

We now have the pieces in place to complete the induction step.

Elementary algebra shows that if , then also , so we can calculate:

 The case that A and B are bounded open sets:

In this setting, both bodies can be approximated arbitrarily well by unions of disjoint axis aligned rectangles contained in their interior; this follows from general facts about the Lebesgue measure of open sets. That is, we have a sequence of bodies , which are disjoint unions of finitely many axis aligned rectangles, where , and likewise . Then we have that , so .

 The case that A and B are compact sets:

For a compact body X, define  to be the -thickening of X. Here each  is the open ball of radius , so that  is a bounded, open set. We note that , so that if X is compact, then . By using associativity and commutativity of Minkowski sum, along with the previous case, we can calculate that . Sending   to 0 establishes the result.

 The case of bounded measurable sets:

Thus,  for all k, using the case of Brunn–Minkowski shown for compact sets. Sending  establishes the result.

 The case of measurable sets:

We let , and again argue using the previous case that , hence the result follows by sending k to infinity.

We give a proof of the Brunn–Minkowski inequality as a corollary to the Prékopa–Leindler inequality, a functional version of the BM inequality. We will first prove PL, and then show that PL implies a multiplicative version of BM, then show that multiplicative BM implies additive BM. The argument here is simpler than the proof via cuboids, in particular, we only need to prove the BM inequality in one dimensions. This happens because the more general statement of the PL-inequality than the BM-inequality allows for an induction argument.

 The multiplicative form of the BM inequality

In particular, . The Prékopa–Leindler inequality is a functional generalization of this version of Brunn–Minkowski. 

 Prékopa–Leindler inequality

Theorem (Prékopa–Leindler inequality): Fix . Let  be non-negative, measurable functions satisfying  for all . Then  .

Proof (Mostly following this lecture): 

We will need the one dimensional version of BM, namely that if  are measurable, then . First, assuming that  are bounded, we shift  so that . Thus, whence by almost disjointedness we have that . We then pass to the unbounded case by filtering with the intervals 

We first show the  case of the PL inequality. Let  , and note that  . Thus, by the one-dimensional version of Brunn–Minkowski, we have that . We recall that if  is non-negative, then Fubini's theorem implies .

Now we prove the   case. For , we pick  and set . For any c, we define , that is, defining a new function on n-1 variables by setting the last variable to be  . Applying the hypothesis and doing nothing but formal manipulation of the definitions, we have that .

Thus, by the inductive case applied to the functions , we obtain . We define  and  similarly. In this notation, the previous calculation can be rewritten as: . Since we have proven this for any fixed , this means that the function  satisfy the hypothesis for the one dimensional version of the PL theorem. Thus, we have that , implying the claim by Fubini's theorem. QED

 PL implies multiplicative BM

The multiplicative version of Brunn–Minkowski follows from the PL inequality, by taking  . 

 Multiplicative BM implies Additive BM

We now explain how to derive the BM-inequality from the PL-inequality. First, by using the indicator functions for   Prékopa–Leindler inequality quickly gives the multiplicative version of Brunn–Minkowski: . We now show how the multiplicative BM-inequality implies the usual, additive version.

We assume that both A,B have positive volume, as otherwise the inequality is trivial, and normalize them to have volume 1 by setting . We define ; note that . With these definitions, and using that , we calculate using the multiplicative Brunn–Minkowski inequality that:

The additive form of Brunn–Minkowski now follows by pulling the scaling out of the leftmost volume calculation and rearranging.

Important corollaries

The Brunn–Minkowski inequality gives much insight into the geometry of high dimensional convex bodies. In this section we sketch a few of those insights.

Concavity of the radius function (Brunn's theorem) 

Consider a convex body . Let  be vertical slices of K. Define  to be the radius function; if the slices of K are discs, then r(x) gives the radius of the disc K(x), up to a constant. For more general bodies this radius function does not appear to have a completely clear geometric interpretation beyond being the radius of the disc obtained by packing the volume of the slice as close to the origin as possible; in the case when K(x) is not a disc, the example of a hypercube shows that the average distance to the center of mass can be much larger than r(x). We note that sometimes in the context of a convex geometry, the radius function has a different meaning, here we follow the terminology of this lecture.

By convexity of K, we have that . Applying the Brunn–Minkowski inequality gives , provided . This shows that the radius function is concave on its support, matching the intuition that a convex body does not dip into itself along any direction. This result is sometimes known as Brunn's theorem.

Brunn–Minkowski symmetrization of a convex body

Again consider a convex body  . Fix some line   and for each   let   denote the affine hyperplane orthogonal to   that passes through  . Define,  ; as discussed in the previous section, this function is concave. Now, let . The concavity of the radius function defined in the previous section implies that that  is convex. This construction is called the Brunn–Minkowski symmetrization.

Grunbaum's theorem

Theorem (Grunbaum's theorem ): Consider a convex body .

Grunbaum's theorem can be proven using Brunn–Minkowski inequality, specifically the convexity of the Brunn–Minkowski symmetrization . See these lecture notes for a proof sketch.

Grunbaum's inequality has the following fair cake cutting interpretation. Suppose two players are playing a game of cutting up an  dimensional, convex cake. Player 1 chooses a point in the cake, and player two chooses a hyperplane to cut the cake along. Player 1 then receives the cut of the cake containing his point. Grunbaum's theorem implies that if player 1 chooses the center of mass, then the worst that an adversarial player 2 can do is give him a piece of cake with volume at least a  fraction of the total. In dimensions 2 and 3, the most common dimensions for cakes, the bounds given by the theorem are approximately  respectively. Note, however, that in  dimensions, calculating the centroid is  hard , limiting the usefulness of this cake cutting strategy for higher dimensional, but computationally bounded creatures.

Applications of Grunbaum's theorem also appear in convex optimization, specifically in analyzing the converge of the center of gravity method. See theorem 2.1 in these notes.

Isoperimetric inequality

Let  denote the unit ball. For a convex body, K, let  define its surface area. This agrees with the usual meaning of surface area by the Minkowski-Steiner formula. Consider the function . The isoperimetric inequality states that this is maximized on Euclidean balls.

We use this calculation to lower bound the surface area of   via  Next, we use the fact that  , which follows from the Minkowski-Steiner formula, to calculate  Rearranging this yields the isoperimetric inequality:

Applications to inequalities between mixed volumes

The Brunn–Minkowski inequality can be used to deduce the following inequality  , where the   term is a mixed-volume. Equality holds iff K,L are homothetic. (See theorem 3.4.3 in Hug and Weil's course on convex geometry.)

 
We recall the following facts about mixed volumes :  , so that in particular if  , then .

Let  . Thus, where   denotes the right derivative. We also have that  . From this we get  , where we applied BM in the last inequality.

Concentration of measure on the sphere and other strictly convex surfaces

We prove the following theorem on concentration of measure, following notes by Barvinok and notes by Lap Chi Lau. See also Concentration of measure#Concentration on the sphere.

Let . Let  denote the surface area on the sphere. Then, for any  we have that .

Proof: Let  , and let  . In particular,  . 

We let  , and aim to show that  . Let   . Then,

.

This implies that  .

Thus, we know that  , so  .

. QED

Version of this result hold also for so-called strictly convex surfaces, where the result depends on the modulus of convexity. However, the notion of surface area requires modification, see: the aforementioned notes on concentration of measure from Barvinok.

Remarks
The proof of the Brunn–Minkowski theorem establishes that the function

is concave in the sense that, for every pair of nonempty compact subsets A and B of Rn and every 0 ≤ t ≤ 1,

 

For convex sets A and B of positive measure, the inequality in the theorem is strict
for 0 < t < 1 unless A and B are positive homothetic, i.e. are equal up to translation and dilation by a positive factor.

Examples

Rounded cubes
It is instructive to consider the case where  an  square in the plane, and  a ball of radius  . In this case,  is a rounded square, and its volume can be accounted for as the four rounded quarter circles of radius  , the four rectangles of dimensions   along the sides, and the original square. Thus,  .

This is made precise for the first mixed volume in the section above on the applications to mixed volumes.

Examples where the lower bound is loose

The left-hand side of the BM inequality can in general be much larger than the right side. For instance, we can take X to be the x-axis, and Y the y-axis inside the plane; then each has measure zero but the sum has infinite measure. Another example is given by the Cantor set. If  denotes the middle third Cantor set, then it is an exercise in analysis to show that .

Connections to other parts of mathematics 

The Brunn–Minkowski inequality continues to be relevant to modern geometry and algebra. For instance, there are connections to algebraic geometry, and combinatorial versions about counting sets of points inside the integer lattice.

See also
 Isoperimetric inequality
 Milman's reverse Brunn–Minkowski inequality
 Minkowski–Steiner formula
 Prékopa–Leindler inequality
 Vitale's random Brunn–Minkowski inequality
 Mixed volume

References
 

 
 Heinrich Guggenheimer (1977) Applicable Geometry, page 146, Krieger, Huntington  .
 
 
 
 Rolf Schneider, Convex bodies: the Brunn–Minkowski theory, Cambridge University Press, Cambridge, 1993.

References

Calculus of variations
Geometric inequalities
Hermann Minkowski
Sumsets
Theorems in convex geometry
Theorems in measure theory